"Bamthathile" is a single by South African DJ and music producer Sun-El Musician featuring  South African singer Mlindo the Vocalist, second single from his debut studio album Africa to the World (2018). It was released on February 23, 2018, by EL World Music. The song was certified double  platinum by the Recording Industry of South Africa (RiSA).

Track listing
Digital download and streaming
 "Bamthathile"  – 4:00

Certifications

Release history

References 

2018 songs